On Their Own is a 1940 American comedy film directed by Otto Brower and written by Harold Buchman and Val Burton. This last of 17 Jones Family films stars Spring Byington, Kenneth Howell, George Ernest, June Carlson, Florence Roberts, and Billy Mahan. The film was released on May 17, 1940, by 20th Century Fox.

Plot

Cast
Spring Byington as Mrs. John Jones
Kenneth Howell as Jack Jones
George Ernest as Roger Jones
June Carlson as Lucy Jones
Florence Roberts as Granny Jones
Billy Mahan as Bobby Jones
Marguerite Chapman as Margaret
John Qualen as Peters
Charles Judels as Giuseppe Galentoni
Chick Chandler as Doc Duggan
Forrester Harvey as Mr. Pim
Isabel Randolph as Hortense Dingwell
Walter Soderling as Mr. Flint
William B. Davidson as Judge Bull
Charles Lane as Johnson

References

External links

1940 films
American comedy films
1940 comedy films
20th Century Fox films
Films directed by Otto Brower
American black-and-white films
Films scored by Samuel Kaylin
1940s American films
1940s English-language films